The Auburn Doubledays are a collegiate summer baseball team of the Perfect Game Collegiate Baseball League (PGCBL) that is located in Auburn, New York. From 1958 to 2020, they were members of Minor League Baseball's New York–Penn League (NYPL). They have played their home games at Leo Pinckney Field at Falcon Park since 1995. They previously played at the original Falcon Park, which was built in 1927 on the same site. The team is owned and operated by Auburn Community Baseball.

Auburn began in the NYPL in 1958 and has since competed under various names and served as the farm team for a number of Major League Baseball teams. The Doubledays and its mascot, Abner, are named for Abner Doubleday, the Civil War general and Auburn native apocryphally credited with inventing the game of baseball. Abner wears number 96 in honor of the birth of the team in 1996. With Major League Baseball's reorganization of the minor leagues after the 2020 season, Auburn was not selected to continue in affiliated baseball. The city and the team's ownership group are exploring options such as independent baseball or collegiate summer baseball for 2021. Eventually they signed a deal to become members of the Perfect Game Collegiate Baseball League (PGCBL) starting in 2021 season.

History

Early championship era
In 1958, the Auburn New York–Penn League franchise was founded as the Auburn Yankees, as an affiliate of the New York Yankees. The Yankees affiliation lasted until 1961. The club included future Major League Baseball All-Stars Jim Bouton, Joe Pepitone, and Mel Stottlemyre. The team then became affiliated with the New York Mets, as the Auburn Mets. With a roster that included Billy Wynne, Don Shaw, Tug McGraw, and Jerry Koosman, the club won the league championship three times: in 1962, 1964, and 1966.

In 1967, the club changed its affiliation to the Minnesota Twins and became the Auburn Twins. The Twins won NYPL title in 1967 and 1970.

In 1972, the team was renamed the Auburn Phillies after associating with the Philadelphia Phillies. In 1973, under manager Harry Lloyd, the team won league championship. Future major leaguers Luis Aguayo, Randy Lerch, Dickie Noles, Lonnie Smith, and Ozzie Virgil, among numerous others, played for the team. Managers of note included Mike Compton and Ruben Amaro.

Co-op seasons
In 1978, the team became the Auburn Sunsets and were co-operated by the Phillies and Houston Astros. Managed by Dick Rockwell, the team went achieved a 32–40 record, finishing third in the league's Yawkey Division. The team featured future major league players Carmelo Castillo and Alejandro Sanchez and future major league general manager Dave Littlefield.

In 1979 the club became known as the Auburn Red Stars. The team featured future MLB player Doug Frobel. The Red Stars operated under a co-operative agreement. The Red Stars received players from seven different major league organizations, led by the Detroit Tigers, with seven players, and Cleveland Indians, with five.

In 1980, the Red Stars changed their name to the Auburn Americans. The team once again operated as a co-op and received 17 players from the Cleveland Indians and several from the Los Angeles Dodgers. The squad featured future MLB player Jack Fimple and finished fourth in the New York–Penn League's West Division with a 29–45 record.

Astros era

Auburn returned to play in the New York–Penn League in 1982 with the Auburn Astros as an affiliate of the Houston Astros.

In 1991, with John H. Graham as general manager, the team set the all-time attendance record at Falcon Park.

Doubledays
The team was renamed the Auburn Doubledays before the 1996 season and has operated under that name since.

In 1998, the Doubledays and the Oneonta Yankees were named co-champions of the New York–Penn League after Central New York was hit with a torrential rain storm and the fields at both parks were deemed unplayable.

Under the management of Dennis Holmberg, the Doubledays won the Pinckney Division title for six straight years in 2002, 2003, 2004, 2005, 2006, and 2007, but failed to win the league championship for the first five of those years. After losing in the first round of the playoffs for the first three years of their streak, they advanced to the New York–Penn League championship series before being swept by the Staten Island Yankees. In 2003, the Doubledays led all of baseball in winning percentage (.757).

The Doubledays finally won the NYPL title in 2007, sweeping the Brooklyn Cyclones in the league championship series. The final game featured a stellar pitching performance by Brett Cecil and a home run by J. P. Arencibia. This was the first league championship for the city of Auburn since 1973.

After the cancelled 2020 minor league season, Major League Baseball took direct control of Minor League Baseball and discontinued short-season play. The Doubledays were not among the four teams invited to remain as full-season affiliates of the Washington Nationals, with whom they had been affiliated since 2011. The city and the team's ownership group are exploring options such as independent baseball or collegiate summer baseball for 2021.

Season-by-season results

Playoffs
1968 season: Defeated Williamsport, 1–0, in semifinals; lost to Oneonta, 1–0, in championship.
1978 season: Lost to Geneva, 2–0, in championship.
1985 season: Defeated Jamestown, 1–0, in semifinals; lost to Oneonta, 2–0, in championship.
1986 season: Lost to St. Catharines, 1–0, in semifinals.
1994 season: Defeated Watertown, 2–0, in semifinals; lost to New Jersey, 2–0, in championship.
1998 season: Defeated Batavia, 2–0, in semifinals; declared co–champions with Oneonta (series rained out).
2002 season: Lost to Oneonta, 2–0, in semifinals.
2003 season: Lost to Williamsport, 2–0, in semifinals.
2004 season: Lost to Mahoning Valley, 2–0, in semifinals.
2005 season: Defeated Oneonta, 2–0, in semifinals; lost to Staten Island, 2–0, in championship.
2006 season: Lost to Tri-City, 2–1, in semifinals.
2007 season: Defeated Oneonta, 2–1, in semifinals; defeated Brooklyn, 2–0, to win championship.
2011 season: Defeated Vermont, 2–1, in semifinals; lost to Staten Island, 2–0, in championship.
2012 season: Lost to Tri-City, 2–1, in semifinals.
2018 season: Lost to Hudson Valley Renegades 2–0, in semifinals.
2021 season: Defeated Utica 7-0, in quarterfinals; lost to Amsterdam 7-1, in semifinals.

Roster

Alumni

Notable Auburn Astros players

 Troy Afenir, 1983
 Mark Bailey, 1982
 Jeff Ball, 1990
 Ramón Castro, 1995
 Gary Cooper, 1986
 Jeff Datz, 1982, 1984
 Cameron Drew, 1985
 John Fishel, 1985
 Tom Funk, 1983
 Luis Gonzalez, 1988
 Jason Green, 1995
 Mike Grzanich, 1993
 John Halama, 1994
 Dean Hartgraves, 1987
 Chris Hatcher, 1990
 Randy Hennis, 1987
 Chris Holt, 1992
 Trent Hubbard, 1986
 Blaise Ilsley, 1985
 Chuck Jackson, 1984
 Todd Jones, 1989
 Kenny Lofton, 1988, 1989
 Julio Lugo, 1995
 Rob Mallicoat, 1984
 Dave Meads, 1984
 Brian Meyer, 1986
 Ray Montgomery, 1990
 Andy Mota, 1987, 1988
 James Mouton, 1991
 Bryant Nelson, 1994
 Al Osuna, 1987
 Shane Reynolds, 1989
 Oscar Robles, 1995
 Dave Rohde, 1986
 Sean Runyan, 1994
 Roger Samuels, 1983
 Brian Sikorski, 1995
 Mark Small, 1989
 Chris Truby, 1994
 Billy Wagner, 1993
 Jamie Walker, 1992
 Donne Wall, 1989
 Dan Walters, 1985
 Terry Wells, 1985
 Ed Whited, 1986
 Brian Williams, 1990
Rhett Wiseman, 2015
 Robbie Wine, 1983

Other notable Auburn players

 Rick Dempsey (catcher)
 Ozzie Virgil (catcher)
 Ramon Castro (catcher)
 John Buck (catcher)
 Joe Pepitone (1st base)
 Ed Kranepool (1st base)
 David Cooper (1st base)
 Ken Boswell (2nd base)
 Aaron Hill (2nd base)
 Morgan Ensberg (3rd base)
 Ryan Roberts (3rd base)
 Julio Lugo (shortstop)
 R. C. Orlan (pitcher)
 Eugenio Vélez (shortstop)
 Cleon Jones (right field)
 Lonnie Smith (left field)
 Adam Lind (left field)
 Johan Santana (starting pitcher)
 Jerry Koosman (starting pitcher)
 Mel Stottlemyre (starting pitcher)
 Roy Oswalt (starting pitcher)
 Rollie Sheldon (starting pitcher)
 Robert Ray (starting pitcher)
 Brett Cecil (starting pitcher)
 Marc Rzepczynski (starting pitcher)
 Ricky Romero (starting pitcher)
 Shaun Marcum (starting pitcher)
 David Purcey (starting pitcher)
 Dustin McGowan (starting pitcher)
 Jesse Litsch (starting pitcher)
 Mike Zagurski (starting pitcher)
Nick Pivetta (starting pitcher)
 Tug McGraw (bullpen)
 Billy Wagner (bullpen)
 Casey Janssen (bullpen)
 Brandon League (bullpen)
 David Bush (bullpen)
 Rafael Bautista

Future Major League Baseball staff
 Jeff Datz, an Indians, Orioles, and Mariners coach, played for the Auburn Astros in 1982 and 1984. As of 2011, Datz is the only former member of the Auburn Astros to reach MLB as both a player and a coach.
 Glenn Sherlock, a Yankees and Diamondbacks coach, played for the Auburn Astros in 1983 and 1984.
 Ken Bolek, an Indians coach in 1992 and 1993, was a coach for the 1985 Auburn Astros.
 Gary Tuck, a Yankees and Red Sox bullpen coach, was the Auburn Astros manager in 1987.
 Rick Aponte, former Nationals bullpen coach, was the Auburn Astros pitching coach in 1987.
 Ron Porterfield, head athletic trainer of the Rays, began his professional baseball career as the trainer for the 1988 Auburn Astros.
 Manny Acta, an Expos and Mets coach and then Nationals and Indians manager, managed the Auburn Astros from 1993 to 1995. He also managed the Auburn Doubledays, in 1996.

Front office and staff
 Steve DeSalvo was the team's general manager from 1982 to 1983. He went on to a long career as a Minor League Baseball executive.
 Auburn native Leslie Leary was general manager from 1984 to 1987. She was one of the first female general managers in Minor League Baseball.
 Auburn native Joe Kehoskie, a baseball agent, worked for the team from 1984 to 1991.
 Bob Neal, previously the general manager of the Watertown Pirates and Peninsula Pilots, was general manager from early 1988 to late 1989.
 John H. Graham, previously the general manager of the Peninsula Pilots, was assistant general manager from early 1988 to early 1989; business manager from early 1989 to late 1989; and general manager from late 1989 to late 1991.
 Marc Techman, an Auburn native, was assistant general manager in 1991.
 Shawn Smith, currently a vice president with the NBA, was general manager from 1994 to 1995.
 TV/radio announcer Cory Provus worked for the team in 2000.
 Charlie Wride was the team's public address announcer for most of the team's 14-season existence, as well as the team historian. Wride continued to work for the team's successor, the Auburn Doubledays, in a community relations capacity until his death in 2018 at the age of 81.

Wall of Fame

References

External links
 
 Statistics from Baseball-Reference
 Photographs of Falcon Park, home of the Auburn Doubledays – Rochester Area Ballparks

Baseball teams established in 1958
New York–Penn League teams
Professional baseball teams in New York (state)
Auburn, New York
Houston Astros minor league affiliates
Minnesota Twins minor league affiliates
New York Mets minor league affiliates
New York Yankees minor league affiliates
Philadelphia Phillies minor league affiliates
Toronto Blue Jays minor league affiliates
Washington Nationals minor league affiliates
Fan-owned baseball teams
1958 establishments in New York (state)